The  is a  Kofun period burial mound located in what is now the Sōja neighborhood of the city of Maebashi, Gunma Prefecture in the northern Kantō region of Japan. The site was designated a National Historic Site of Japan in 1944. It is one of several kofun in the Sōja Kofun Group.

Overview
The Hōtōzan Kofun is located on the west bank of the Tone River. Neither fukiishi nor haniwa have been found. The burial chamber is a stone-lined chamber with a total length of 12 meters. The walls are made from rectangular megalithic blocks of andesite, which were once plastered and presumably decorated with paint. The stone sarcophagus is shaped like a house, and was placed perpendicular to the long axis of the chamber. It is presumed to have been built at the end of the 7th century AD, or at the very end of the Kofun period, when Buddhist ritual practices were supplanting the tumulus culture. No grave goods have been found.

Overall length 54 meters
Overall width 54 meters
Height 12 meters

The tumulus is located near the Jaketsuzan Kofun, the Kōzuke Kokubun-ji and the provincial capital of Kōzuke Province, and is located approximately a 10-minute walk from Sōja Station on the JR East Jōetsu Line.

During the early Edo period, the area around Sōja was ruled as Sōja Domain, a 15,000 koku feudal domain under the Tokugawa shogunate ruled by the Akimoto clan as daimyō. The Akimoto ruled from 1601 to 1633, and the graves of the clan were built on top of the Hōtōzan Kofun.

See also
List of Historic Sites of Japan (Gunma)

References

External links

Maebashi City official site 
Gunma Prefectural Site 

Kofun
History of Gunma Prefecture
Maebashi
Archaeological sites in Japan
Historic Sites of Japan